Bonny-sur-Loire (literally Bonny on Loire) is a commune in the Loiret department of the Centre-Val de Loire region of north-central France.

Place name
The name is evidenced historically at least since the beginning of the seventeenth century.

Geography
The commune of Bonny stands beside the river Loire, at the border of the Bourgogne-Franche-Comté region and separated from the Nièvre department by the river Cheuille. The town is situated on the main route between Paris and Nevers, the A77 and RN7.

Population

The inhabitants are known as Bonnychons.

Administration
The mayor since March 2001 has been Michel Lechauve.

Sights
Suspension bridge between Bonny-sur-Loire et Beaulieu-sur-Loire (carrying the road D926)

Quality of life
Bonny-sur-Loire is a ville fleurie, graded at the level of three flowers by the National Council for the Villes et Villages Fleuris de France.

Celebrations
 Val de Jazz : in July
 Wine festival and Second-Hand Market : the last Sunday in July
 Salon of autumnal art: the week of 1 November
 Saint-Aignan : each year, in November

Personalities
 Nicolas Habicot (1550–1624), surgeon of the Duke of Nemours and anatomist, was born at Bonny
 François Jean-Baptiste d'Alphonse (1756–1821) born at Bonny, was a politician of the 18th-19th centuries
 Désiré Lubin (1854–1929), painter, born at Bonny.

See also
 Communes of the Loiret department

References

External links

 Official site

Communes of Loiret